Ancharius is the nomen of the Roman gens Ancharia.  It may refer to various members of that family.

Ancharius may also refer to a genus of catfish native to the island of Madagascar, including the following species:

 Ancharius brevibarbis
 Ancharius fuscus
 Ancharius griseus